Honolulu is a city magazine covering Honolulu and the Hawaii region. It dates back to 1888 when it was called Paradise of the Pacific. It is the oldest magazine in the state of Hawaii and is the longest published magazine west of the Mississippi. Honolulu is a member of the City and Regional Magazine Association (CRMA).

History
In 1888, when Hawaii was still a monarchy, King Kalākaua commissioned a magazine under royal charter to be Hawaii's ambassador to the world. That magazine was Paradise of the Pacific. For nearly a century, Paradise of the Pacific promoted local business and tourism by assuring citizens of the United States that the Islands were civilized. Noted contributors to Paradise of the Pacific included Henry B. Christian, Helen Thomas Dranga, Arman Manookian, and Edwin North McClellan.

In 1966, Paradise of the Pacific became Honolulu Magazine.

In 1977, David Pelligrin acquired it through his Honolulu Publishing Company and raised the bar for journalists in the islands. Honolulu shifted its focus to news and features aimed at an affluent residential audience. It covers dining, culture, arts, politics, entertainment in and around Honolulu and throughout Hawaii. Honolulu also has an annual dining awards called the Hale Aina Awards. Under Pelligrin in 1984, Honolulu established the awards as the islands’ first local restaurant awards. Before then, culinary awards in the Islands had only been given by mainland travel interests.

In 2001, Duane Kurisu, the owner of PacificBasin Communications, acquired the magazine from the Honolulu Publishing Company. The company also publishes Hawaii Business, Hawaii Home and Remodeling, Hawaii, Honolulu Family, Lei Chic, Whalers Village and Honolulu Shops Waikiki.

Since 2004, Honolulu has held a photo contest which asks people to submit photos they have taken of Hawaii throughout the previous year.

Honolulu also has an annual statewide fiction contest, though the last contest took place in 2006.

As of 2017, Honolulu'''s owner, Duane Kurisu, who bought the magazines in 2001, also serves on the board of directors of Oahu Publications Inc.

Awards
2015 – Sour Poi Awards
2016 – CRMA Award and National Prize
2017 – Soi Poi Awards
2018 – CRMA Awards

See alsoHawaii BusinessFurther readingHawai'i Chronicles: Island History from the Pages of Honolulu Magazine.  Edited by Bob Dye.  1996, Hawai'i Chronicles II: Contemporary Island History from the Pages of Honolulu Magazine.  Edited by Bob Dye.  1997,  Hawai'i Chronicles III: World War Two in Hawai'i, from the Pages of Paradise of the Pacific.  Edited by Bob Dye.  2000.  

References

External linksParadise of the Pacific'' at the HathiTrust

1888 establishments in Hawaii
Monthly magazines published in the United States
Local interest magazines published in the United States
Magazines established in 1888
Magazines published in Hawaii
Mass media in Honolulu